Rumi Jaffery  is an Indian scriptwriter and filmmaker who works predominantly in Hindi cinema. He is popular for penning scripts of successful Bollywood films like Coolie No. 1, Biwi No.1, Hero No. 1 in association with David Dhawan. He wrote scripts for around 50 films before turning into a director with God Tussi Great Ho and went on to make films like Life Partner, Gali Gali Chor Hai and Chehre.

Early life and background

Rumy Jaffery was born in Bhopal to renowned poet Kausar Siddiqui and later moved to Bombay to pursue his career in Bollywood before working in theater since the age of 10.

Career
Rumy debuted as writer with 1992 Bollywood film Paayal and went on to write for over 54 films. He's popular for his works in collaboration with David Dhawan. He also directed films like God Tussi Great HoLife Partner, Gali Gali Chor Hai and Chehre.

Filmography

Films 
As Writer

As Director

References

External links

Hindi-language film directors
Living people
1966 births